The Niaz Stadium is a cricket ground in Hyderabad, Pakistan.  The ground has a capacity of 15,000, and hosted its first test match in 1973. It was established in November 1961 by then Commissioner of Hyderabad, Niaz Ahmed, after whom the stadium is named.

The first ever hat-trick in One Day Internationals was taken at this ground by Pakistan's Jalal-ud-Din at this stadium during Australia's 1982–83 tour of Pakistan. Jalal-ud-Din removed Rod Marsh, Bruce Yardley, and Geoff Lawson with the last three balls of his seventh over.

Niaz Stadium celebrated staging Test cricket's 1000th match. In addition, Pakistan has never lost any match, whether a test or one-day, at this ground.

History
Niaz Stadium is situated in the heart of Hyderabad, one of the most populous cities of Pakistan. The stadium has been named after Niaz Ahmed, the late commissioner of Hyderabad, who was the motivating factor for building this stadium.

The inaugural first class match was played at Niaz Stadium between South Zone v Pakistan Education Board (PEB) on 16–18 March 1962. Niaz Stadium become the 32nd first class ground in Pakistan and 2nd in Hyderabad.

Only five Tests have so far been played at Hyderabad: two each against England and New Zealand, and one against India. The inaugural Test match at the ground took place from 16–21 March 1973 against England, and it was resulted in a draw after big scoring England picked up 487 with Dennis Amiss scoring 158. Pakistan in reply, did even better, compiling 569 before declaring after nine wickets had fallen. Mushtaq Mohammad hit 157 and Intikhab Alam 138. England played out time by hitting 218 for 6 wickets for the match to end in a draw.

The last Test played at Niaz Stadium was between Pakistan and New Zealand on 25–29 November 1984. Niaz Stadium celebrated staging the Test cricket's 1000th match with Pakistan winning the rubber with more than a day to spare. Javed Miandad became the second Pakistani after Hanif Mohammed to score a century in each innings of a Test. Niaz Stadium boasts of the fact that Pakistan never lost a Test or One-day International here.

After a ten-year hiatus, an international match was played at the ground on 24 January 2008 between Pakistan and Zimbabwe. In April 2018, the Pakistan Cricket Board (PCB) announced that the venue, along with several others in the country, would get a makeover to get them ready for future international matches and fixtures in the Pakistan Super League.

Records and statistics

Test 
 Highest team total: 581/3d, by Pakistan against India on 14 January 1983.
 Lowest team total: 189, by India against Pakistan on 14 January 1983.
 Highest individual score: 280*, Javed Miandad for Pakistan against India on 14 January 1983.
 Highest partnership: 451, for the 3rd wicket by Mudassar Nazar and Javed Miandad for Pakistan against India on 14 January 1983.
 Most wickets: 16 wickets, in 3 matches by Abdul Qadir.
 Most runs: 661 runs, in 4 matches by Javed Miandad.

One Day International 
 Highest team total: 267/6, by Pakistan against Sri Lanka on 8 October 1987.
 Lowest team total: 127, by Sri Lanka against Pakistan on 3 November 1985.
 Highest individual score: 115*, by Javed Miandad for Pakistan against Sri Lanka on 15 January 1992.
 Highest partnership: 137, for the 3rd wicket by Hamilton Masakadza and Tatenda Taibu for Zimbabwe against Pakistan on 24 January 2008.
 Most runs: 335 runs, in 5 matches by Javed Miandad.
 Most wickets: 7 wickets, in 2 matches by Aaqib Javed.

Key

Tests
Two five wicket hauls have been taken at Niaz Stadium:

See also
 List of Test cricket grounds
 List of stadiums in Pakistan
 List of cricket grounds in Pakistan
 List of sports venues in Karachi
 List of sports venues in Lahore
 List of sports venues in Faisalabad

References

External links
 Location on Wikimaps, 2009
 Archive Records from Niaz Stadium
 Pictures of the recent match between Pakistan and Zimbabwe
 CricketArchive

Test cricket grounds in Pakistan
Hyderabad District, Pakistan
Stadiums in Pakistan
Cricket grounds in Pakistan
1959 establishments in Pakistan
1987 Cricket World Cup stadiums